Michael Reniger, D.D.  was  an English priest in the late 16th and early 17th centuries.

Reniger was  educated at Magdalen College, Oxford.  He held livings at Broughton, Crawley and Chilbolton. Reniger was appointed Chancellor of Lincoln Cathedral in 1566 (Precentor, 1567/ Subdean, 1568); Archdeacon of Winchester in 1575; and Canon of St. Paul's in 1583. He died on 26 August 1609.

Notes

1609 deaths
Lincoln Cathedral
Archdeacons of Winchester (ancient)
Alumni of Magdalen College, Oxford